The 2021 Gator Bowl was a college football bowl game played on December 31, 2021, with kickoff at 11:00 a.m. EST and televised on ESPN. It was the 77th edition of the Gator Bowl, and was one of the 2021–22 bowl games concluding the 2021 FBS football season. Sponsored by financial technology company TaxSlayer, the game was officially known as the TaxSlayer Gator Bowl.

On December 22, Texas A&M withdrew from the bowl, citing a breakout of positive COVID-19 cases and season-ending injuries limiting them to few players. The bowl committee then worked to secure another participant.

On December 23, the NCAA football oversight committee approved Rutgers as the first bowl alternate, under rules whereby five-win teams are ranked by Academic Progress Rate (APR) calculations.  Rutgers finished first in APR among the five-win schools and was given the option to accept the bid. The NCAA also allowed the game to be postponed as late as January 10, if needed by a replacement team. Rutgers accepted the bid, and the game date was not altered.

Teams
The bowl has tie-ins with the Atlantic Coast Conference (ACC) and the Southeastern Conference (SEC). The initially planned matchup of Wake Forest vs. Texas A&M was consistent with those ties-ins, until Texas A&M had to withdraw from the bowl due to an insufficient number of players being available. Rutgers of the Big Ten was subsequently named as a replacement team due to having the highest APR amongst candidates.

Wake Forest Demon Deacons

Wake Forest enters the bowl with a 10–3 record (7–1 in ACC play). The Demon Deacons won their first eight games, then went 2–3 over their final five games. Wake Forest played two ranked teams, defeating NC State and losing to Pittsburgh.

Rutgers Scarlet Knights

Rutgers finished their season with a 5–7 record (2–7 in Big Ten play). The Scarlet Knights won their first three games, then lost four in a row, and finished the season by going 2–3 in their final five games. Four of their losses came against ranked teams in FBS.

Game summary

Statistics

References

External links
 Game statistics at statbroadcast.com

Gator Bowl
Gator Bowl
Rutgers Scarlet Knights football bowl games
Wake Forest Demon Deacons football bowl games
Gator Bowl
Gator Bowl